Living Up (Chinese: 更上一層樓) is a Hong Kong TVB series about luxury housing.  Luxurious type homes are generally referred to as "豪宅", literally a mansion, pronounced as "hou zaak" in Cantonese.  The houses featured on the show are expensively furnished with some of the best city views, often accompanied by excellent feng shui.

Geography
Hong Kong has a very limited land space.  Many of the homes are large by HK standard, but are actually quite small by international standards.

Seasons

Episodes

References
 Official website

TVB original programming